La Llacuna is a municipality of 884 inhabitants (2003), located in  the comarca of Anoia, in the province of Barcelona, Catalonia, Spain.

It is a tourist town; nearby destinations include Igualada, the Vilafranca del Penedès wine route, and the Monastery of Montserrat.

Geography
The town's altitude is 615 m, and the municipality has a surface area of 52,49 km².

Annual events
Annual events include the Potada, whose date varies, but is usually in April; Aplec del Castell on the last Sunday of May; Fira de Sant Andreu on the first Sunday of December, and the pessebre vivent (living crib), a full-scale, live tableau of scenes from Bethlehem at the time of the birth of Jesus, on the second or third Sunday in December.

Food
A local specialty is carquinyolis, a type of cookie.

References

External links
 
Llacuna Website
 Government data pages 

Llacuna